Goodbye, Mr Kent is a BBC comedy television series of seven episodes, which first aired from 28 January to 11 March 1982. But it was a flop, despite starring Richard Briers and Hannah Gordon.

Recently divorced Victoria Jones with young daughter Lucy takes in a boarder to pay the bills. But her boarder, the wayward and slobbish but charming journalist Travis Kent, sponges off her and tries to woo her.

It was produced by Gareth Gwenlan, and written by Peter Robinson and Peter Vincent.

It was remade in West Germany in 1985 as Die Nervensäge and went on for 26 episodes. Peter Vincent and Peter Robinson wrote all of them. Episode 1 to 7 where remakes of the BBC shows, episode 8 to 26 were exclusively written for Germany. Dieter Hallervorden played the main character who was not called Kent but Willi Böck.

Cast 
 Richard Briers as Travis Kent 
 Hannah Gordon as Victoria Jones 
 Talla Hayes as Lucy Jones

External links 

Goodbye Mr Kent at comedy.co.uk  
Goodbye Mr Kent at phill.co.uk

References  

1980s British sitcoms
1982 British television series debuts
1982 British television series endings
British comedy television shows
BBC television sitcoms